The Shire of Cocos (Keeling) Islands is a local government area which manages local affairs on the Australian external territory of Cocos (Keeling) Islands (post code: 6799). The island is grouped with Western Australia but is administered by the Department of Infrastructure, Regional Development and Cities and an Administrator.

The current shire president is Aindil Minkom, who was elected in October 2019.

History
From the 19th century onwards, the islands were owned by the Clunies-Ross family, and in 1886 were granted to them in perpetuity by Queen Victoria. On 23 November 1955 the islands were transferred to Australian control under the Cocos (Keeling) Islands Act 1955. In 1978, Australia entered a form of purchase of the islands with the Clunies-Ross family, and the Cocos (Keeling) Islands Council came into existence in July 1979 as a representative of the Cocos Malay community.

Administration
The Administrator is Natasha Griggs, who was appointed on 5th October 2017 and is also the Administrator of Christmas Island. These two Territories comprise Australia's Indian Ocean Territories. The Australian Government provides Commonwealth-level government services through the Indian Ocean Territories Administration and the Department of Infrastructure, Regional Development and Cities.  As per the Federal Government's Territories Law Reform Act 1992, which came into force on 1 July 1992, Western Australian laws are applied to the Cocos Islands, "so far as they are capable of applying in the Territory"; non-application or partial application of such laws is at the discretion of the federal government.  The Act also gives Western Australian courts judicial power over the islands.  The Cocos (Keeling) Islands remain constitutionally distinct from Western Australia, however; the power of the state to legislate for the territory is a power delegated by the federal government. The kind of services typically provided by a state government elsewhere in Australia are provided by departments of the Western Australian Government, and by contractors, with the costs met by the federal government.

There also exists a unicameral Cocos (Keeling) Islands Shire Council with seven seats. A full-term lasts four years, though elections are held every two years; approximately half the members retire each two years, alternating elections of three and four members for a total of seven.  The first elections to the Shire Council, established by ordinance, were held in May 1993.  The shire has seven councillors and no wards.

The Shire's offices are at Jalan Bunga Kangkong, Home Island.

Federally, Cocos (Keeling) Islanders form the electorate of Lingiari with Christmas Island and outback Northern Territory.

Members
There are currently six council members, with one seat being vacant.

See also
 List of leaders of the Cocos (Keeling) Islands Shire Council

References

External links
 

Government of the Cocos (Keeling) Islands
Cocos
1955 establishments in Australia